Filippo Tommaso Emilio Marinetti (22 December 1876 – 2 December 1944) was an Italian poet, editor, art theorist, and founder of the Futurist movement. He was associated with the utopian and Symbolist artistic and literary community Abbaye de Créteil between 1907 and 1908. Marinetti is best known as the author of the first Futurist Manifesto, which was written and published in 1909, and as a co-author of the Fascist Manifesto, in 1919.

Childhood and adolescence
Emilio Angelo Carlo Marinetti (some documents give his name as "Filippo Achille Emilio Marinetti") spent the first years of his life in Alexandria, Egypt, where his father (Enrico Marinetti) and his mother (Amalia Grolli) lived together more uxorio (as if married). Enrico was a lawyer from Piedmont, and his mother was the daughter of a literary professor from Milan. They had come to Egypt in 1865, at the invitation of Khedive Isma'il Pasha, to act as legal advisers for foreign companies that were taking part in his modernization program.

His love for literature developed during the school years. His mother was an avid reader of poetry, and introduced the young Marinetti to the Italian and European classics. At age seventeen he started his first school magazine, Papyrus; the Jesuits threatened to expel him for publicizing Émile Zola's scandalous novels in the school.

He first studied in Egypt then in Paris, obtaining a baccalauréat degree in 1894 at the Sorbonne, and in Italy, graduating in law at the University of Pavia in 1899.

He decided not to be a lawyer but to develop a literary career. He experimented with every type of literature (poetry, narrative, theatre, words in liberty), signing everything "Filippo Tommaso Marinetti".

Futurism

Marinetti and Constantin Brâncuși were visitors of the Abbaye de Créteil c. 1908 along with young writers like Roger Allard (one of the first to defend Cubism), Pierre Jean Jouve, and Paul Castiaux, who wanted to publish their works through the Abbaye. The Abbaye de Créteil was a phalanstère community founded in the autumn of 1906 by the painter Albert Gleizes, and the poets René Arcos, Henri-Martin Barzun, Alexandre Mercereau and Charles Vildrac. The movement drew its inspiration from the Abbaye de Thélème, a fictional creation by Rabelais in his novel Gargantua. It was closed down by its members early in 1908.

Marinetti is known best as the author of the Futurist Manifesto, which he wrote in 1909. It was published in French on the front page of the most prestigious French daily newspaper, Le Figaro, on 20 February 1909. In The Founding and Manifesto of Futurism, Marinetti declared that "Art, in fact, can be nothing but violence, cruelty, and injustice." Georges Sorel, who influenced the entire political spectrum from anarchism to Fascism, also argued for the importance of violence. Futurism had both anarchist and Fascist elements; Marinetti later became an active supporter of Benito Mussolini.

Marinetti, who admired speed, had a minor car accident outside Milan in 1908 when he veered into a ditch to avoid two cyclists. He referred to the accident in the Futurist Manifesto: the Marinetti who was helped out of the ditch was a new man, determined to end the pretense and decadence of the prevailing Liberty style. He discussed a new and strongly revolutionary programme with his friends, in which they should end every artistic relationship with the past, "destroy the museums, the libraries, every type of academy". Together, he wrote, "We will glorify war—the world's only hygiene—militarism, patriotism, the destructive gesture of freedom-bringers, beautiful ideas worth dying for, and scorn for woman".

The Futurist Manifesto was read and debated all across Europe, but Marinetti's first 'Futurist' works were not as successful. In April, the opening night of his drama Le Roi bombance (The Feasting King), written in 1905, was interrupted by loud, derisive whistling by the audience... and by Marinetti himself, who thus introduced another element of Futurism, "the desire to be heckled." Marinetti did, however, fight a duel with a critic he considered too harsh.

His drama La donna è mobile (Poupées électriques), first presented in Turin, was not successful either. Nowadays, the play is remembered through a later version, named Elettricità sessuale (Sexual Electricity), and mainly for the appearance onstage of humanoid automatons, ten years before the Czech writer Karel Čapek invented the term robot.

In 1910 his first novel, Mafarka il futurista, was cleared of all charges by an obscenity trial. That year, Marinetti discovered some allies in three young painters (Umberto Boccioni, Carlo Carrà, Luigi Russolo), who adopted the Futurist philosophy. Together with them (and with poets such as Aldo Palazzeschi), Marinetti began a series of Futurist Evenings, theatrical spectacles in which Futurists declaimed their manifestos in front of a crowd that in part attended the performances to throw vegetables at them.

The most successful "happening" of that period was the publicization of the "Manifesto Against Past-Loving Venice" in Venice. In the flier, Marinetti demands "fill(ing) the small, stinking canals with the rubble from the old, collapsing and leprous palaces" to "prepare for the birth of an industrial and militarized Venice, capable of dominating the great Adriatic, a great Italian lake."

In 1911, the Italo-Turkish War began and Marinetti departed for Libya as war correspondent for a French newspaper. His articles were eventually collected and published in The Battle of Tripoli. He then covered the First Balkan War of 1912–13, witnessing the surprise success of Bulgarian troops against the Ottoman Empire in the Siege of Adrianople. In this period he also made a number of visits to London, which he considered 'the Futurist city par excellence', and where a number of exhibitions, lectures and demonstrations of Futurist music were staged. However, although a number of artists, including Wyndham Lewis, were interested in the new movement, only one British convert was made, the young artist C.R.W. Nevinson. Nevertheless, Futurism was an important influence upon Lewis's Vorticist philosophy.

About the same time Marinetti worked on a very anti-Roman Catholic and anti-Austrian verse-novel, Le monoplan du Pape (The Pope's Aeroplane, 1912) and edited an anthology of futurist poets. But his attempts to renew the style of poetry did not satisfy him. So much so that, in his foreword to the anthology, he declared a new revolution: it was time to be done with traditional syntax and to use "words in freedom"  (parole in libertà). His sound-poem Zang Tumb Tumb, an account of the Battle of Adrianople, exemplifies words in freedom. Recordings can be heard of Marinetti reading some of his sound poems: Battaglia, Peso + Odore (1912); Dune, parole in libertà (1914);  La Battaglia di Adrianopoli (1926) (recorded 1935).

Wartime
Marinetti agitated for Italian involvement in World War I, and once Italy was engaged, promptly volunteered for service. In the fall of 1915 he and several other Futurists who were members of the Lombard Volunteer Cyclists were stationed at Lake Garda, in Trentino province, high in the mountains along the Italo-Austrian border. They endured several weeks of fighting in harsh conditions before the cyclists units, deemed inappropriate for mountain warfare, were disbanded.

Marinetti spent most of 1916 supporting Italy's war effort with speeches, journalism, and theatrical work, then returned to military service as a regular army officer in 1917. In May of that year he was seriously wounded while serving with an artillery battalion on the Isonzo front; he returned to service after a long recovery, and participated in the decisive Italian victory at Vittorio Veneto in October 1918.

Marriage
After an extended courtship, in 1923 Marinetti married Benedetta Cappa (1897–1977), a writer and painter and a pupil of Giacomo Balla.  Born in Rome, she had joined the Futurists in 1917.  They'd met in 1918, moved in together in Rome, and chose to marry only to avoid legal complications on a lecture tour of Brazil.  They had three daughters:  Vittoria, Ala, and Luce.

Cappa and Marinetti collaborated on a genre of mixed-media assemblages in the mid-1920s they called tattilismo ("Tactilism"), and she was a strong proponent and practitioner of the aeropittura movement after its inception in 1929. She also produced three experimental novels.  Cappa's major public work is likely a series of five murals at the Palermo Post Office (1926–1935) for the Fascist public-works architect Angiolo Mazzoni.

Marinetti and Fascism
In early 1918 he founded the Partito Politico Futurista or Futurist Political Party, which only a year later merged with Benito Mussolini's Fasci Italiani di Combattimento. Marinetti was one of the first affiliates of the Italian Fascist Party. In 1919 he co-wrote with Alceste De Ambris the Fascist Manifesto, the original manifesto of Italian Fascism. He opposed Fascism's later exaltation of existing institutions, terming them "reactionary," and, after walking out of the 1920 Fascist party congress in disgust, withdrew from politics for three years. However, he remained a notable force in developing the party philosophy throughout the regime's existence. For example, at the end of the Congress of Fascist Culture that was held in Bologna on 30 March 1925, Giovanni Gentile addressed Sergio Panunzio on the need to define Fascism more purposefully by way of Marinetti's opinion, stating, "Great spiritual movements make recourse to precision when their primitive inspirations—what F. T. Marinetti identified this morning as artistic, that is to say, the creative and truly innovative ideas, from which the movement derived its first and most potent impulse—have lost their force. We today find ourselves at the very beginning of a new life and we experience with joy this obscure need that fills our hearts—this need that is our inspiration, the genius that governs us and carries us with it."

As part of his campaign to overturn tradition, Marinetti also attacked traditional Italian food. His Manifesto of Futurist Cooking was published in the Turin Gazzetta del Popolo on 28 December 1930. Arguing that "People think, dress and act in accordance with what they drink and eat", Marinetti proposed wide-ranging changes to diet. He condemned pasta, blaming it for lassitude, pessimism and lack of virility, and promoted the eating of Italian-grown rice. In this, as in other ways, his proposed Futurist cooking was nationalistic, rejecting foreign foods and food names. It was also militaristic, seeking to stimulate men to be fighters.

Marinetti also sought to increase creativity.  His attraction to whatever was new made scientific discoveries appealing to him, but his views on diet were not scientifically based. He was fascinated with the idea of processed food, predicting that someday pills would replace food as a source of energy, and calling for the creation of "plastic complexes" to replace natural foods. Food, in turn, would become a matter of artistic expression. Many of the meals Marinetti described and ate resemble performance art, such as the "Tactile Dinner", recreated in 2014 for an exhibit at the Guggenheim Museum. Participants wore pajamas decorated with sponge, sandpaper, and aluminum, and ate salads without using cutlery.

During the Fascist regime Marinetti sought to make Futurism the official state art of Italy but failed to do so. Mussolini was personally uninterested in art and chose to give patronage to numerous styles to keep artists loyal to the regime. Opening the exhibition of art by the Novecento Italiano group in 1923, he said: "I declare that it is far from my idea to encourage anything like a state art. Art belongs to the domain of the individual.  The state has only one duty: not to undermine art, to provide humane conditions for artists, to encourage them from the artistic and national point of view." Mussolini's mistress, Margherita Sarfatti, successfully promoted the rival Novecento Group, and even persuaded Marinetti to be part of its board.

In Fascist Italy, modern art was tolerated and even approved by the Fascist hierarchy. Towards the end of the 1930s, some Fascist ideologues (for example, the ex-Futurist Ardengo Soffici) wished to import the concept of "degenerate art" from Germany to Italy and condemned modernism, although their demands were ignored by the regime. In 1938, hearing that Adolf Hitler wanted to include Futurism in a traveling exhibition of degenerate art, Marinetti persuaded Mussolini to refuse to let it enter Italy.

On 17 November 1938, Italy passed The Racial Laws, discriminating against Italian Jews, much as the discrimination pronounced in the Nuremberg Laws. The antisemitic trend in Italy resulted in attacks against modern art, judged too foreign, too radical and anti-nationalist. In the 11 January 1939 issue of the Futurist journal, Artecrazia Marinetti expressed his condemnation of such attacks on modern art, noting Futurism is both Italian and nationalist, not foreign, and stating that there were no Jews in Futurism. Furthermore, he claimed Jews were not active in the development of modern art. Regardless, the Italian state shut down Artecrazia.

Marinetti made numerous attempts to ingratiate himself with the regime, becoming less radical and avant garde with each attempt. He relocated from Milan to Rome. He became an academician despite his condemnation of academies, saying, "It is important that Futurism be represented in the Academy."

He was an atheist, but by the mid 1930s he had come to accept the influence of the Catholic Church on Italian society. In Gazzetta del Popolo, 21 June 1931, Marinetti proclaimed that "Only Futurist artists...are able to express clearly...the simultaneous dogmas of the Catholic faith, such as the Holy Trinity, the Immaculate Conception and Christ's Calvary." In his last works, written just before his death in 1944 L'aeropoema di Gesù ("The Aeropoem of Jesus") and Quarto d'ora di poesia per the X Mas ("A Fifteen Minutes' Poem of the tenth MAS"), Marinetti sought to reconcile his newfound love for God and his passion for the action that accompanied him throughout his life.

There were other contradictions in his character: despite his nationalism, he was international, educated in Egypt and France, writing his first poems in French, publishing the Futurist Manifesto in a French newspaper and traveling to promote his ideas.

Marinetti volunteered for active service in the Second Italo-Abyssinian War and the Second World War, serving on the Eastern Front for a few weeks in the Summer and Autumn of 1942 at the age of 65.

He died of cardiac arrest in Bellagio on 2 December 1944 while working on a collection of poems praising the wartime achievements of the Decima Flottiglia MAS.

Writings
 Marinetti, Filippo Tommaso, Il Fascino dell'Egitto (The Charm of Egypt), A. Mondadori – Editore, 1933, https://archive.org/details/marinetti_fascino_1933A/page/n3/mode/2up, Italian version available online
Marinetti, Filippo Tommaso: Mafarka the Futurist. An African novel, Middlesex University Press, 1998, Italian version available online
 Marinetti, Filippo Tommaso: Selected Poems and Related Prose, Yale University Press, 2002, 
 Marinetti, Filippo Tommaso: Critical Writings, ed. by  Günter Berghaus, New York : Farrar, Straus, and Giroux, 2006, 549p., pocket edition 2008: 
 Carlo Schirru, Per un’analisi interlinguistica d’epoca: Grazia Deledda e contemporanei, Rivista Italiana di Linguistica e di Dialettologia, Fabrizio Serra editore, Pisa-Roma, Anno XI, 2009, pp. 9–32
 Filippo Tommaso Marinetti, Le Futurisme, textes annotés et préfacés par Giovanni Lista, L’Age d’Homme, Lausanne, 1980
 Filippo Tommaso Marinetti, Les Mots en liberté futuristes, préfacés par Giovanni Lista, L’Age d’Homme, Lausanne, 1987
 Giovanni Lista, F. T. Marinetti, Éditions Seghers, Paris, 1976
 Marinetti et le futurisme, poèmes, études, documents, iconographie, réunis et préfacés par Giovanni Lista, bibliographie établie par Giovanni Lista, L’Age d’Homme, Lausanne, 1977
 Giovanni Lista, F. T. Marinetti, l’anarchiste du futurisme, Éditions Séguier, Paris, 1995
 Giovanni Lista, Le Futurisme : création et avant-garde, Éditions L’Amateur, Paris, 2001
 Giovanni Lista, Le Futurisme, une avant-garde radicale, coll. "Découvertes Gallimard" (n° 533), Éditions Gallimard, Paris, 2008.
 Giovanni Lista, Journal des Futurismes, Éditions Hazan, coll. "Bibliothèque", Paris, 2008
 Antonino Reitano, L'onore, la patria e la fede nell'ultimo Marinetti, Angelo Parisi Editore, 2006
 Barbara Meazzi, Il fantasma del romanzo. Le futurisme italien et l'écriture romanesque (1909–1929), Chambéry, Presses universitaires Savoie Mont Blanc, 2021, 430 pp.,

References

Further reading

 Robbins, Daniel, Sources of Cubism and Futurism, Art Journal, Vol. 41, No. 4, (Winter 1981): pp. 324–327, College Art Association

External links

 ItalianFuturism.org: news, exhibitions, and scholarship pertaining to the Futurist Movement
 
 
 
 Works of F.T. Marinetti digitized on Internet Archive by Archivio del '900 of Mart, in Rovereto
 Image of Le Figaro with Le Futurisme (1909)
 Score to the sound poem Dune, parole in libertà (1914)
 Marinetti's "La Battaglia di Adrianopoli" (1926) recorded by Marinetti in 1935 published at LTM
 Filippo Tommaso Marinetti Papers. General Collection, Beinecke Rare Book and Manuscript Library.
 Filippo Tommaso Marinetti's Libroni on Futurism Images derived from slides taken of seven scrapbooks compiled by Marinetti between 1905 and 1944 from the Beinecke Rare Book and Manuscript Library at Yale University
 

Italian male classical composers
Italian classical composers
Italian male poets
Italian anti-communists
Italian Futurism
Italian military personnel of World War I
Italian military personnel of the Second Italo-Ethiopian War
Italian military personnel of World War II
Italian Roman Catholics
Converts to Roman Catholicism from atheism or agnosticism
1876 births
1944 deaths
Futurism
Futurist composers
Futurist writers
Italian writers in French
Italian magazine editors
Italian art critics
Members of the Royal Academy of Italy
Italian magazine founders
Modernist writers
People from Alexandria
People of the Italian Social Republic
War correspondents of the Balkan Wars
Burials at the Cimitero Monumentale di Milano
19th-century classical composers
20th-century classical composers
19th-century Italian composers
20th-century Italian composers
19th-century Italian poets
20th-century Italian poets
19th-century Italian writers
20th-century Italian male writers
19th-century Italian male writers
Anti-Masonry
Italian male non-fiction writers
20th-century Italian male musicians
19th-century Italian male musicians